Pleospora lycopersici is a plant pathogen infecting tomatoes.

References

External links 
 Index Fungorum
 USDA ARS Fungal Database

Fungal plant pathogens and diseases
Tomato diseases
Pleosporaceae
Fungi described in 1921